David Alexander Brodie (born 15 May 1943) is a British auto racing driver. He is best known for his time competing in the British Touring Car Championship. His best season in the BTCC was in 1985, finishing fourth overall on points.

Career 

Brodie started motor racing in 1968 winning his first race at Silverstone in an Austin A35. Since then, he has completed in over 700 races and driven saloons, sports cars, and Formula Three single seaters. Brodie was seriously injured in a crash during the British Saloon Car Championship support race for the 1973 British Grand Prix at Silverstone.

He is credited with being the seventh most successful driver ever at Brands Hatch and has held lap records on all UK circuits. The record he set at Thruxton in 1989 for saloons remained unbroken until 1995.Having raced at virtually all the European circuits, Brodie also competed in a number of 500 km and 24-hour races. The last of these was Le Mans in 1994 when he qualified as fastest team driver and then led LM2 until the car was withdrawn in the early hours of Sunday morning.

Interesting fuel consumption statistics from this event showed that during 1.5 hour driving stints, Brodie used 13 litres less than one driver and 8 litres less than the other.

In later years, Brodie raced successfully in the VW saloon car series winning races and establishing new lap records.

Brodie was an active director of the BRDC and until recently, was a director of the Springfield boys club with Jackie Stewart, a post he held for 27 years. He is also still an active director of BBR GTi, a company Brodie developed following a successful racing career beginning in the 1970s. He had two sons from his first marriage to Kathy Brodie and is now married to Peggy Brodie.

Racing record

Complete British Saloon / Touring Car Championship results
(key) (Races in bold indicate pole position – 1973–1990 in class) (Races in italics indicate fastest lap – 1 point awarded ?–1989 in class)

† Events with 2 races staged for the different classes.

‡ Endurance driver.

References

External links
David Brodie at driver database

1943 births
Living people
British Touring Car Championship drivers
24 Hours of Le Mans drivers